Unforgettable is the fourth book in The It Girl series, released in 2007. It was written by a ghostwriter with suggestions from Cecily von Ziegesar. Aimed toward young adults, it is a spin-off from the bestselling Gossip Girl series.

Plot summary
After being torn between Callie Vernon and Jenny Humphrey, Easy Walsh makes his decision and chooses Callie. Although Jenny and Callie made a pact to put their friendship before relationships with Easy in front of the whole school, Callie will certainly not give him up for her sophomore roommate.

Meanwhile, Brett Messerschmidt is still upset about the breakup with Jeremiah. After Jeremiah lost his virginity to Elizabeth, Brett had enough with guys. Surprisingly, Brett finds love in the most unexpected place: Kara Whalen, and confides in the most unexpected person: Heath Ferro, an inveterate gossip. Not ready to declare her sexuality to the student body, Brett keeps the relationship a secret by bribing Heath with sexy pictures of her and Kara. As a result of this, the three become surprisingly close.

Tinsley Carmichael does the unexpected and hooks up with a freshman: Julian McCafferty. However, Tinsley finds Julian growing increasingly more distant, and she cannot accept he might be bored with her.

Brandon Buchanan is completely over Callie and Jenny and is completely in love with Elizabeth, a unique and spunky girl who goes to Jeremiah's school. However, Elizabeth is afraid of being tied down to commitment and wants to be free to see other people, much to Brandon's discontent. Then at a party hosted by Tinsley he sees her flirting with another guy and decides he is not able to have an open relationship with her.

At a special off-campus party hosted by Tinsley, Easy proclaims his love for Callie, and they sleep together in a barn while the party rages on.  Jenny walks in on them, runs out of the barn before they see her and finds Julian behind it.  They talk and realize their feelings for each other, finally kissing. A fire in the barn interrupts them: a fire started by Tinsley throwing Julian's lighter away after seeing them.  Suddenly, when the group returns to Waverly, rumors are flying about who actually started the fire. When Jenny confronts Callie about what she saw, they both accuse each other of starting the fire.

Brett and Kara's secret is exposed when an intoxicated Callie lets the secret slip at the party, Kara having told Callie the secret after a meeting of Women of Waverly, the club started by Brett for girls to talk about their problems. Soon the entire student body knows that their prefect is in a lesbian relationship. Fueled by anger, Brett is hungry for revenge.

Dean Marymount finds out about the fire in the barn and is planning to expel whoever was responsible. Tinsley and Callie seize this chance to frame Jenny and get rid of her once and for all.

References

2007 American novels
Chick lit novels
Novels by Cecily von Ziegesar
American young adult novels